Bayırüzü is a village in the Eruh District of Siirt Province in Turkey. The village is populated by Kurds of the Botikan tribe and had a population of 65 in 2021.

References 

Villages in Eruh District
Kurdish settlements in Siirt Province